Korat Chatchai Hall is an indoor sporting arena, located in His Majesty the King's 80th Birthday Anniversary, 5 December 2007, Sports Complex, Nakhon Ratchasima, Thailand. The arena name after former Prime Minister of Thailand, Chatichai Choonhavan.  The capacity of the arena is 5,000 spectators.

It is used mainly for boxing, basketball, futsal, and volleyball.

References

Indoor arenas in Thailand
2007 establishments in Thailand
Basketball venues in Thailand
Volleyball venues in Thailand
Boxing venues in Thailand